is a castle structure in Fukui, Fukui Prefecture, Japan.

Current
The castle is now only ruins, with some stone walls and moats. In 2017, the castle was listed as one of the Continued Top 100 Japanese Castles.

References

Castles in Fukui Prefecture
Former castles in Japan
Mihama, Fukui